Sanni Maija Franssi (born 19 March 1995) is a Finnish professional footballer who plays as a forward for Spanish Primera División club Real Sociedad and the Finland women's national team.

Club career
In 2016 Franssi was named Naisten Liiga Player of the Season after hitting 20 league goals for her club, PK-35. Franssi spent the 2016–17 season with FC Zürich Frauen, scoring 18 goals and finishing as runner-up to FC Neunkirch in both the Nationalliga A and Swiss Women's Cup. She returned to PK-35 in July 2017, only to sign for newly founded Serie A club Juventus in September.

In December 2021 Franssi was playing for Real Sociedad of Spain's Primera División but was reported to be attracting transfer interest from multiple clubs in England's FA Women's Super League.

International career
Franssi played her first senior international for Finland women's national team in February 2015 against Sweden. She had already represented her country at the 2014 FIFA U-20 Women's World Cup.

She scored her first senior international goal in a 3–2 UEFA Women's Euro 2017 qualifying defeat by Portugal on 16 September 2016.

International goals

Honours

PK-35 Vantaa
 Naisten Liiga: Winner 2012, 2014, 2015
 Naisten Suomen Cup: Winner 2012, 2013

Juventus FC
 Serie A: Winner 2017-18

Fortuna Hjørring
 Danish Women's Cup: Winner 2018-2019
 Elitedivisionen: Winner 2019-2020

References

External links
 
 Sanni Franssi profile at Football Association of Finland (SPL) 
 

1995 births
Finnish women's footballers
Finland women's international footballers
Finnish expatriate sportspeople in Italy
Expatriate women's footballers in Italy
Living people
Kansallinen Liiga players
PK-35 Vantaa (women) players
Women's association football midfielders
Serie A (women's football) players
Juventus F.C. (women) players
Finnish expatriate footballers
Expatriate women's footballers in Switzerland
Finnish expatriate sportspeople in Switzerland
Swiss Women's Super League players
FC Zürich Frauen players
Fortuna Hjørring players
Expatriate women's footballers in Denmark
Expatriate women's footballers in Spain
Primera División (women) players
Real Sociedad (women) players
Finnish expatriate sportspeople in Spain
Finnish expatriate sportspeople in Denmark
Elitedivisionen players
Sportspeople from Vaasa
UEFA Women's Euro 2022 players